National Highway 502 or NH 502 connects Venus Saddle and Saiha in Mizoram, India. The total length of the highway is 23 km and runs only in the state of Mizoram.

See also
 List of National Highways in India (by Highway Number)
 List of National Highways in India
 National Highways Development Project

References

External links
 NH 502 on OpenStreetMap

National highways in India
502